Yazan Dahshan (born June 13, 1990) is a Jordanian footballer who plays for Shabab Al-Aqaba.

References

External links

1990 births
Living people
Jordanian footballers
Association football forwards
People from Amman
Al-Ahli SC (Amman) players
Al-Faisaly SC players
Shabab Al-Aqaba Club players
Jordanian Pro League players